Loukhi is an urban locality (an urban-type settlement) and the administrative center of Loukhsky District in the Republic of Karelia, Russia, located on the shore of Lake Panovo,  north of Petrozavodsk, the capital of the republic. As of the 2010 Census, its population was 4,772.

History
It was founded in 1912–1914 due to the construction of a railroad. Urban-type settlement status was granted to it in 1944.

In 1978, Korean Air Lines Flight 902 was forced to land at the nearby Lake Korpiyarvi after being attacked by Soviet aircraft.

Administrative and municipal status
Within the framework of administrative divisions, Loukhi serves as the administrative center of Loukhsky District, of which it is a part. As a municipal division, Loukhi is incorporated within Loukhsky Municipal District as Loukhskoye Urban Settlement.

References

Notes

Sources

Urban-type settlements in the Republic of Karelia
Loukhsky District